Agustini may refer to:

 Delmira Agustini (1886-1914), Uruguayan poet
 Luis de Agustini (born 1976), naturalized Libyan football goalkeeper

See also

 Agustin
 Agustina (disambiguation)
 Agustino
 Augustin (disambiguation)
 Augustina
 Augustine
 Augustini
 Augustino (given name)
 Megachile agustini

Italian-language surnames